Pierre Cordier (born 27 May 1972) is a French politician representing the Republicans. He was elected to the French National Assembly on 18 June 2017, representing the 2nd constituency of the department of Ardennes.

Career 
He is the Shadow Minister for Labour and Training in the Shadow Cabinet of France.

See also
 List of deputies of the 15th National Assembly of France

References

1972 births
Living people
Deputies of the 15th National Assembly of the French Fifth Republic
Deputies of the 16th National Assembly of the French Fifth Republic
The Republicans (France) politicians
People from Charleville-Mézières
Politicians from Grand Est